Raymond Krug (19 October 1924 – 8 January 1990) was a French footballer. He competed in the men's tournament at the 1948 Summer Olympics.

References

External links
 

1924 births
1990 deaths
French footballers
Olympic footballers of France
Footballers at the 1948 Summer Olympics
Footballers from Strasbourg
Association football midfielders
RC Strasbourg Alsace players